Peter Loudon (born 17 November 1966 in Perth, Scotland) is a Scottish curler and world champion. He is the alternate player on the David Murdoch team.

He won a gold medal (with skip Hammy McMillan) at the 1999 Ford World Curling Championships in Saint John, New Brunswick. He has received two gold medals at the European Curling Championships.

Loudon competed for Great Britain at the 2002 Winter Olympics.

Loudon is on the board of directors at Scottish football club St Johnstone, for whom his grandfather, Peter Gavigan, played during the 1920s.

He is a brother of Edith Loudon and Katie Loudon.

References

External links 

1966 births
Living people
Scottish male curlers
British male curlers
Olympic curlers of Great Britain
Curlers at the 2002 Winter Olympics
World curling champions
European curling champions